Peter W. Mullin (born 1941) is an American businessman and philanthropist. He is the founder of the M Financial Group and chairman of its subsidiary, M Financial Holdings. Additionally, he serves as the chairman of Mullin Barens Sanford Financial. He is the founder and patron of the Mullin Automotive Museum in Oxnard, California.

Early life
Peter William Mullin was born in South Pasadena, California near Los Angeles, California. He graduated with a bachelor of arts degree in Economics from the University of California, Santa Barbara.

Career
Mullin founded Mullin Consulting in Downtown Los Angeles in 1969. He served as its chief executive officer until 2003 and as its chairman until 2006.

Mullin co-founded the M Financial Group with Mark Solomon, Carl Mammel, and Eli Morgan in 1978. He serves as the chairman of its subsidiary, M Financial Holdings. Headquartered in Portland, Oregon, it offers life insurance and other financial services to "the ultra-affluent and corporate markets."

Additionally, Mullin serves as the chairman of Mullin Barens Sanford Financial, an executive compensation firm.

Mullin served on the board of directors of Avery Dennison from 1998 to 2013. He serves on the Advisory Board of Main Management.

Mullin was a member of the Los Angeles Business Advisors, a group of 24 businessmen who opposed Mayor Richard Riordan's policy of creating "neighbourhood councils" in Downtown Los Angeles in 1998.

Philanthropy
An avid car collector, Mullin established the Mullin Automotive Museum in Oxnard, California, in 2010. Additionally, he serves as the president of the American Bugatti Club. He is also a member of the Bugatti Trust. He serves on the Advisory Boards of the Autry National Center and the Guggenheim Foundation. He serves on the board of trustees of the Good Samaritan Hospital, a hospital affiliated with the University of Southern California.  He also serves as the chairman of the Music Center Foundation, the fundraising arm of the Los Angeles Music Center.

Mullin has supported colleges and universities. He formerly served as the chair of the board of trustees of Occidental College. He also served on the board of trustees of the California Institute of Technology. He has served on the board of visitors of the UCLA Anderson School of Management since 1990. He pledged a US$5 million donation to Anderson in 1999. As a result, the Mullin Management Commons at UCLA was named in his honor. Moreover, Mullin has served on the board of trustees of the Art Center College of Design in Pasadena since 2011. With his wife, he donated US$15 million to the Art Center in 2013.

Mullin has supported Roman Catholic charities. He serves on the board of Paulist Productions. Additionally, he serves on the board of trustees of the Saint John's Health Center, a Roman Catholic hospital in Santa Monica, California, where the Mullin Plaza and the Mullin Gardens were named in his honor in 2013. With his wife and The Angell Foundation, he has also supported a program of Roman Catholic scholars at the Institute for Advanced Catholic Studies of the USC Dornsife College for Letters, Arts and Sciences.

Mullin is a Knight of Malta and a Knight of Saint Gregory.

Personal life
Mullin and his wife Merle reside in Brentwood, a suburb on the West side of Los Angeles. They have six children between them. They own a property in Umbria, Italy, where they make "olive oil, wine, honey, and raise Cinta Senese pigs for prosciutto."

Mullin inducted into the Confrérie des Chevaliers du Tastevin in 1990.

He won Best of Show at the Pebble Beach Concours d'Elegance in 2011.

References

1941 births
Living people
People from South Pasadena, California
People from Brentwood, Los Angeles
University of California, Santa Barbara alumni
Businesspeople from California
American car collectors
American corporate directors
Philanthropists from California
Knights of Malta
Knights of St. Gregory the Great